The Washington Haggadah is a Hebrew-language illuminated manuscript haggadah created by Joel ben Simeon in 1478. He was a specialist illuminator of haggadot, who seems to have worked in both Italy and Germany, and whose style shows influences from the contemporary art of both countries.  

The book was given to the United States Library of Congress in 1916 by Ephraim Deinard as part of the Third Deinard Collection. Originally referred to as Hebraic Manuscript #1, it has since been referred to as the Washington Haggadah in honor of the city.

In 2011, the haggadah was on display at the Metropolitan Museum of Art in New York for some months.

References

External links 
The Washington Haggadah Harvard University Press page with images from inside the haggadah
Metropolitan Museum of Art: The Washington Haggadah 

15th-century illuminated manuscripts
Haggadah of Pesach
Jewish illuminated manuscripts
Jews and Judaism in Washington, D.C.